Peleides may refer to:

Peleides, Achilles son of Peleus in Greek history born around 1300 BC died around 1275 BC 
Morpho peleides (Peleides blue morpho), an iridescent tropical butterfly

See also
Pleiades (disambiguation)